The Haunted Drum is a 2007 Thai horror drama film directed by Nuttapeera Shomsri and Sarunya Noithai.

Plot 
Ping wishes to become a talented musician like his parents who once served as royal musicians. After his grandfather passed away, he asked Ping to release a woman spirit from her suffering. As an adult, he becomes a student of Master Duang, a famous master musician. Master Duang owned the mysterious drum called poeng mang, which is said to have been made by the skin of a beautiful woman named Thip. Ping falls in love with a beautiful girl who teaches him how to master drum skills but she is in fact the ghost living inside the drum. Meanwhile, an arrogant musician called Muan tries to convince all the students to leave Master Duang to join the band of a greedy provincial deputy. Some students die horribly. Even if Muan is defeated by Ping during a drum contest, things get worse and the drum becomes not only an instrument of music but also an instrument of death.

It is revealed that Thip offered herself as sacrifice to create the drum and has been acting as the guardian spirit of the drum ever since. When the deputy tried to steal the sacred drum, he and his men are killed by Thip and he himself is dragged to hell by those that cursed by the drum for his sacrilege. Ping reads the letter from Master Duang with the instruction of an incantation to free the spirit of Thip. Decades later, Ping succeed Master Duang and the academy. One day, during a performance, he sees the vision of Thip and dies, reuniting with her at last in the afterlife.

Release

Home media
The Haunted Drum became available on Toku on 8 April 2017 and as VOD through Amazon Prime Video.

See also
 List of Thai films

References

Further reading
 Horrornews review 
 Thistooismeaningless review 
 24framespersecond review
 Thai Film Journal blog

External links 
  Official website 
 
  เปิงมาง กลองผีหนังมนุษย์ – Perng Mang The Haunted Drum at Siam Zone
  Perng Mang : The Haunted Drum at Cinando

2007 films
2007 horror films
Thai horror films
Thai-language films